The 2005 Open Gaz de France was a women's tennis tournament played on indoor hard courts at the Stade Pierre de Coubertin in Paris, France, that was part of Tier II of the 2005 WTA Tour. It was the 13th edition of the tournament and was held from 7 February until 13 February 2005. Dinara Safina won the singles title. Unseeded Dinara Safina won the singles title.

Finals

Singles

 Dinara Safina defeated  Amélie Mauresmo 6–4, 2–6, 6–3
 It was Safina's 1st title of the year and the 4th title of her career.

Doubles

 Iveta Benešová /  Květa Peschke defeated  Anabel Medina Garrigues /  Dinara Safina 6–2, 2–6, 6–2
 It was Benesova's only title of the year and the 2nd title of her career. It was Peschke's 1st title of the year and the 4th title of her career.

External links 
 ITF tournament edition details

Open Gaz de France
Open GDF Suez
Open Gaz de France
Open Gaz de France
Open Gaz de France
Open Gaz de France